The megabit is a multiple of the unit bit for digital information. The prefix mega (symbol M) is defined in the International System of Units (SI) as a multiplier of 106 (1 million), and therefore
1 megabit =  =  = 1000 kilobits.

The megabit has the unit symbol Mbit or Mb.  The lowercase 'b' in Mb distinguishes it from MB (for megabyte).

The megabit is closely related to the mebibit, a unit multiple derived from the binary prefix mebi (symbol Mi) of the same order of magnitude, which is equal to  = , or approximately 5% larger than the megabit. Despite the definitions of these new prefixes for binary-based quantities of storage by international standards organizations, memory semiconductor chips are still marketed using the metric prefix names to designate binary multiples.

Using the common byte size of eight bits and the standard decimal definition of megabit and kilobyte, 1 megabit is equal to 125 kilobytes (kB) or approximately 122 kibibytes (KiB).

The megabit is widely used when referring to data transfer rates of computer networks or telecommunications systems. Network transfer rates and download speeds often use the megabit as the amount transferred per time unit, e.g., a 100 Mbit/s (megabit per second) Fast-Ethernet connection, or a 10 Mbit/s Internet access service, whereas the sizes of data units (files) transferred over these networks are often measured in megabytes.  To achieve a transfer rate of one megabyte per second one needs a network connection with a transfer rate of eight megabits per second.

Usage
 In telecommunications, the base 10 definition of the unit (one million bits) is standard.
 In the semiconductor industry, it is still common practice to designate random-access memory (RAM), read-only memory (ROM) in a binary interpretation of the metric prefixes, such as the megabit, so that one megabit represents =.
 During the 16-bit game console era, the megabit (Mb) was a commonly used measure of the size (computer data storage capacity) of game cartridges. This size represented one mebibit (Mibit). The vast majority of SNES and Mega Drive (Genesis) games were produced on 8 megabit cartridges, although other sizes such as 4, 12, 16, 24, 32, and 48 Mb cartridges appeared. This usage continued on the Nintendo 64, with cartridge sizes ranging between 32 and 512 Mb.

References

Units of information